Filinsky is a rural locality (a village) in Niginskoye Rural Settlement, Nikolsky District, Vologda Oblast, Russia. The population was 108 as of 2002.

Geography 
The distance to Nikolsk is 28 km, to Nigino is 10 km. Kamenny is the nearest rural locality.

References 

Rural localities in Nikolsky District, Vologda Oblast